The 1953–54 Western International Hockey League season was the 8th season in the league's history.

History
During an end of season meeting, it was moved that all playoff games be best-of-five sets, for it was felt that a seven-game series, which stretches into eight, not only drains the pocketbooks of the fans, but drains the stamina of the players. The question of playing an equal number of games in the WIHL also came up for discussion, with the general feeling being that if Spokane's Flyers can play for the Allan Cup, then they should receive no extra favours.

Standings
Team                  W-L-T    Win%   GF–GA
 Kimberley Dynamiters	24-16-4	.591	233-186
 Nelson Maple Leafs	26-27-3	.491	252-247
 Spokane Flyers		28-32-8	.471	286-291
 Trail Smoke Eaters	21-28-7	.438	230-273

Played interlocking with the Okanagan Senior League.

Playoffs

Semi finals

Best of 5

 Kimberley 5 Spokane 0
 Kimberley 5 Spokane 3
 Spokane 4 Kimberley 0
 Spokane 5 Kimberley 2
 Kimberley 10 Spokane 3

Kimberley Dynamiters beat Spokane Flyers 3 wins to 2.

 Nelson 7 Trail 4
 Nelson 5 Trail 3
 Trail 7 Nelson 4
 Nelson 5 Trail 2

Nelson Maple Leafs beat Trail Smoke Eaters 3 wins to 1.

Final

Best of 5

 Kimberley 2 Nelson 1
 Nelson 4 Kimberley 3
 Nelson 5 Kimberley 2
 Nelson 8 Kimberley 2

Nelson Maple Leafs beat Kimberley Dynamiters 3 wins to 1.

Nelson Maple Leafs advanced to the 1953-54 British Columbia Senior Playoffs.

References 

Western International Hockey League seasons
Wihl Season, 1953-54
Wihl Season, 1953-54